Wolgye Station is a metro station on Seoul Subway Line 1. In the northern part of the city, it lies on the line connecting Seoul's city centre with the cities to the north in Gyeonggi-do.

Gallery

References

External links
 Station information from Korail

Seoul Metropolitan Subway stations
Metro stations in Nowon District
Railway stations in South Korea opened in 1985